Mario Alfonso Castillo Díaz (born 30 October 1957 in San Miguel, El Salvador) is a retired football player.

Club career
Nicknamed Macora, he started his career at local side Dragón when 18 years of age and later played for Águila, with whom he won 3 league titles. In 1978, he joined the star-studded team of Santiagueño, winning another league title with them, and moved to Alianza in 1984 before returning to Águila to end his career with them.

Retirement
Since his retirement from football in 1987, he has been working as a sales manager of a car-service company in his hometown.

International career
Castillo has represented El Salvador in 7 FIFA World Cup qualification matches, but most notably played for his country at the 1982 FIFA World Cup in Spain.

Honours
Primera División de Fútbol de El Salvador: 4
 1972, 1976, 1977, 1980

References

External links
 Bio - El Diario de Hoy 

1951 births
Living people
People from San Miguel, El Salvador
Salvadoran footballers
El Salvador international footballers
1982 FIFA World Cup players
C.D. Águila footballers
Alianza F.C. footballers
Association football defenders